Posets may refer to:

Posets peak, a mountain, second highest of the Pyrenees
Partially ordered sets, a set which follows partial order relation
Poset games, mathematical games of strategy

See also
 Posets-Maladeta Natural Park, in Province of Huesca, Aragón, Spain